Aurelius may refer to:
Members of the Roman gens Aurelia, especially:
Marcus Aurelius, emperor
Aurelius of Asturias, King of Asturias from 768 to 774
Aurelius of Carthage, a fifth-century Christian saint
Aurelius of Córdoba, ninth-century Christian martyrs
Aurelius, New York
Aurelius Township, Michigan
Aurelius Township, Washington County, Ohio
 Aurelius (horse)

See also
 Aurelia (disambiguation)